Daniel Thomas Rowe (born 22 March 1984 in Ogwr, Glamorgan) is a Welsh-born English cricketer, who represented Leicestershire CCC and Oxfordshire Minor Counties. 

Rowe was signed by Leicestershire in 2005 after impressing at Cardiff UCCE and graduating from the university in 2006.  Rowe had previously played his cricket in Wales for Tondu CC and Glamorgan age groups before having a short spell at Somerset CCC during his time in University. 

Rowe is a right hand fast bowling allrounder known for his destructive ability to take games away from the opposition.  He made his debut for Leicestershire CCC against the West Indies in July 2006 and had to wait until 2007 to make his First Class Debut against Essex,  where he would make 85 runs with the bat and taking 2 wickets in the first innings.  

After an impressive debut and a number of strong seasons with Leicestershire’s 2nd Xl, opportunities became limited and like a number of young exciting players within the Leicestershire squad, Rowe was unfortunately released in 2008. 

In 2009, Rowe signed for Oxfordshire CCC, making his Minor Counties Championship debut for the county against Dorset.  He would go on to play 18 championship games and 15 MCCA Knockout Trophy games between 2009 and 2013 for the county. Making a number of match winning performances throughout his 4 seasons, one notability was his hattrick against Hereford CCC in a County Championship at Banbury CC to win game that was slipping away.   

Rowe currently plays in the South Wales Premier League where he has represented Swansea CC, Sully CC, Port Talbot CC and the South Wales Premier League against Glamorgan CCC in 1 day match at Sophia Gardens.

External links
 
 

Leicestershire cricketers
English cricketers
1984 births
Living people
People from Glamorgan
Oxfordshire cricketers
21st-century English people